The Main Street Line is a line of the Memphis Area Transit Authority trolley system. It began operations in 1993, becoming the first streetcar line to operate in Memphis since 1947.
It runs for about  along Main Street, with 14 stops in Downtown Memphis. The Main Street Line is concurrent with the Riverfront Loop for almost all of its length.

Route description
The Main Street Line begins in the South Main Arts District at Butler Avenue.  From here it runs north past major attractions such as the National Civil Rights Museum and Beale Street.  At Peabody Place, Main Street becomes a pedestrian mall allowing the trolley full right-of-way.  On the Main Street Mall, the line passes through the heart of downtown Memphis, passing Court Square, the Civic Center Plaza, and the Cook Convention Center. At Madison Avenue, the tracks connect with the Madison Avenue Line, though the two lines to not have connecting routes. The mall ends at Exchange Street in front of the convention center, whereby the trolley continues north to the North End Terminal on Shadyac Avenue.  The terminal provides connections with the MATA bus system. For the entirety of its route, the Main Street line has a double track, with cars operating in both directions.

In February 2021, MATA opened a new stop in front of Memphis Central Station. Construction of the new stop was funded through a Congestion Mitigation and Air Quality Improvement grant from TDOT.

List of trolley stops
South Main Arts District to North End Terminal

References

Memphis Area Transit Authority
Railway lines opened in 1993